The Shuraya Party (Syriac: ܫܘܖܝܐ) is a political organisation that represents the Christian Assyrian community in Lebanon since the late 1970s. The party advocates the formation of an independent Assyrian State in the Assyrian homeland, in what is today Northern Iraq. The term "shuraya" means 'beginning'.

History
The Shuraya Party was first established on 25 July, 1978 in Beirut, Lebanon, when the country was engulfed by the civil war. Since its foundation, it has worked closely together with Bashir Gemayel, the founder and leader of the Lebanese Forces militia (LF), in which it sees itself connected in the struggle and destiny for all Lebanese Christians. 

It is composed of "free philosophers" of different Eastern Church origins, who regard themselves as Assyrians. The Shuraya leadership insists they are not bound by any Church, but rejects the reproach of being anti-Christian. It claims to represent all oriental Christians and stresses its commitment to maintain a coined Christian Lebanon. 

The party established its own magazine in Lebanon in the 1980s, dubbed Shuraya, and also opened its own radio show named My Voice, to the wave of FM-radio. 

During the Lebanese Civil War, the Party also fielded a small militia, the Assyrian Battalion (AB), which fought alongside the other Christian militias of the Lebanese Front.

See also
Assyrian nationalism
Lebanese Civil War
Lebanese Front

External links
Der VGH Kassel über Aktivitäten und Bedeutung der „Shuraya“ „Informationsangebot“ der Organisation
www.shuraya.de.vu
Lebanese Forces official site.

1978 establishments in Lebanon
Assyrians in Lebanon
Political parties established in 1978
Assyrian nationalism
Assyrian political parties
Christian political parties in Lebanon
March 14 Alliance

Political parties of minorities in Lebanon